The Iowa State Cyclones women's gymnastics team represents Iowa State University (ISU) and competes in the Big 12 Conference of NCAA Division I. The team is coached by  Jay Ronayne, he is in his 11th year at Iowa State.  The Cyclones host their home meets at Hilton Coliseum on Iowa State's campus.

History

Iowa State first put together a women's gymnastic team in time for the 1973-1974 season, Char Christiansen lead that squad.  Christiansen led the Cyclones to their first Big Eight Conference title in 1975.  The Cyclones had limited success through most of the late 1970s and 1980s.

The rebuilding process of the Cyclone program began with the hiring of Head Coach Amy Pyle in 1994.  In 2000, her final season, the team won their first Big 12 championship and placed 8th overall at the NCAA Tournament, the highest finish in program history at that point.

After Pyle's retirement, Iowa State hired former letter winner and assistant coach K. J. Kindler, she would go on to be the most successful coach in program history.  The highlights of her tenure were making back-to-back NCAA Finals in 2005-2006 and Janet Anson's individual career.  In 2006 they won their second Big 12 Championship and made the first and only Super Six in school history.  During her collegiate career, Anson was a four-time First Team All-American in vault (twice), floor, and all-around.  At the conclusion of the season she left for Oklahoma.

Current Head Coach Jay Ronayne has continued where Kindler left off.  Under his leadership the Cyclones have qualified for NCAA Regionals every year and have had ten Big 12 Champions.

Individual Accomplishments

All-Americans

Conference Individual Champions

Facilities

The team practices at the Amy and Dennis Pyle Family Gymnastics Facility that was renovated in 2002.  The facility includes an 80-foot divider wall, matting in all uneven bar and balance beam areas, a balance beam dismount pit, cardiovascular elliptical trainers and treadmills, and an open pit vaulting station.

Past Olympians 
  Ariana Orrego (2016; 2020)
  Marina González (2020)

References

 
College women's gymnastics teams in the United States
Gymnastics, Women's
1970 establishments in Iowa
Sports clubs established in 1970